Jash is a Kurdish term for a traitor, or a type of collaborator, either a military unit composed of Kurds or an individual which cooperates with enemy combatants against the Kurdish people, Kurdish political interests, or the Kurdish Army. The term is considered derogatory in a cultural sense, in much the same way as the use of the term quisling in the Western world. 

Kurds who collaborated with the Ba'ath Government, Kurds in the Village Guards, the Kurdistan BMC, and the Kermanshah NAC are exampled of what would be considered "jash" by most Kurds.

History 

The Light regiments were first established in the 1940s, during the 1943 Barzani revolt in northern Iraq, then it flourished and start to take an important role in the 1960s during the First Iraqi–Kurdish War, when General Khaleel Jassim was in the command of these regiments and associated them with many Iraqi Army operations against the Kurd rebels, specially in Amadiya in 1965 and Rawandiz 1966. 

During the al-Anfal campaign, the military campaign of genocide and looting commanded by Ali Hassan al-Majid, al-Majid's orders informed jash units that taking cattle, sheep, goats, money, weapons and even Kurdish women was legal.

The term "Jash Police" was used by the Kurds towards Iraq's local Kurdish police militias in 1944.

In the latter half of the 20th century, Kurds who became collaborators with the Iraqi government were referred to as jash. The number of jash increased to "as many as 150,000 by 1986" as a method of avoiding military participation in the Iran–Iraq War. The jash then realigned with the rest of the Kurdish people during the 1991 Kurdish uprising. It has been stated by a number of Kurds that "the jash had been completely forgiven".

See also 
 Fifth column
 Collaborationism
 Hanjian
 Kapo
 Village Guards

References 

Ethnic and religious slurs
Kurdish culture
Treason